Gregory Angus Shaw Jackson (born 7 March 1996 in Pietermaritzburg, South Africa) is a South African rugby union player, who most recently played with the . His regular position is loosehead prop or hooker.

Rugby career

2014: Sharks

2015–2016: Eastern Province Kings

After school, he moved to Port Elizabeth to join the  academy, where he was included in the  squad that competed in the 2015 Under-19 Provincial Championship Group A. He didn't feature in their first six matches of the season, but then played off the bench in their matches in Rounds Eight, Nine and Ten. He was promoted to the starting line-up for the remainder of the competition, helping his side to finish top of the log after winning eleven out of their twelve matches. Jackson started their semi-final match against  in Port Elizabeth, which the home side won 31–15, as well as the final, which saw Eastern Province beat s 25–23 in Johannesburg to win the Under-19 Provincial Championship for the first time in their history.

Just six minutes after coming on, Jackson his first senior try; it was one of four tries scored by the Kings in a 35–35 all draw in the match in Greenside.

2016–2017: Gloucester

Jackson moved to English Premiership side Gloucester in 2016, playing for their A side, Gloucester United.

References

1996 births
Living people
Eastern Province Elephants players
Rugby union hookers
Rugby union players from Pietermaritzburg
Rugby union props
South African rugby union players
Alumni of Michaelhouse